Panonija i ja (English: Pannonia and me) is an album of  Zvonko Bogdan, Bunjevac singer from Vojvodina, Serbia. It was released in 2005 on the Vojvodina Sound record label. In Croatia it was released under Hit Records record label.

Track listing
 "Jesen stiže Dunjo moja"
 "Romansa ta"
 "Na kraj sela"
 "Kad te sretoh prvih puta"
 "Kupiću ti cipelice"
 "Ženio se stari Cigan"
 "Aj aj aj aj aj"
 "Pesma za Maestra"
 "Kad se mesec sprema na spavanje"
 "Koncertna igra"
 "Svakog dana"
 "Ima dana"
 "Gde ste noći"
 "Park prinčeva"
 "Ima jedna pisma za tebe"
 "Ko te ima taj te nema"
 "Madjarski Primatialis - Splet rumunskih igara - Igra svitaca"

Credits 
 Zvonko Bogdan - vocals

2005 albums
Zvonko Bogdan albums